India competed at the 1936 Summer Olympics in Berlin, Germany.

Medalists

Gold
 Richard Allen, Dhyan Chand, Earnest Cullen, Ali Dara, Lionel Emmett, Peter Fernandes, Joseph Galibardy, Mohomed Hussain, Mohammed Jaffar, Ahmed Khan, Ahsan Mohomed Khan, Mirza Masood, Cyril Michie, Baboo Nimal, Joseph Phillip, Shabban Shahab ud-Din, G.S. Garewal, Roop Singh, and Carlyle Tapsell — Field hockey, Men's Team Competition.

Field Hockey

Men's Team Competition
Preliminary Round (Group A)
 Defeated  (9–0)
 Defeated  (4–0)
 Defeated  (7–0)
Semi Finals
 Defeated  (10–0)
Final
 Defeated  (8–1) →

References
Official Olympic Reports
International Olympic Committee results database

Nations at the 1936 Summer Olympics
1936